Hasan Hammood Ghlaim Al-Jammali (born 5 October 1986) is an Iraqi professional footballer who plays as a midfielder for Iraqi Premier League club Naft Maysan and the Iraq national team.

International career
On 26 November 2019, Hammood made his first international cap with Iraq against Qatar in the 24th Arabian Gulf Cup.

References

External links
 

1986 births
Living people
Iraqi footballers
Association football midfielders
Naft Maysan FC players
Al-Mina'a SC players
Iraqi Premier League players
Iraq international footballers